Concluding observations on the second periodic report of the Holy See was a 2014 report issued by the Office of the United Nations High Commissioner for Human Rights, regarding the handling by the Catholic Church and Holy See of cases of sexual abuse against minors.

References

Holy See
2014 in law
2014 in Christianity
2014 in international relations
United Nations High Commissioner for Human Rights
Catholic Church sexual abuse scandals
Holy See and the United Nations